HMS Betty was purchased on 24 April 1695. She was previously a privateer at Bristol in British service. After commissioning she went to the West Indies on trade protection duties. She was captured by the French while returning in 1695, however was retaken in 1696 by the British. She was again commissioned in British service and served in the Mediterranean, Guinea and did surveying work off Ireland. She was sold in 1702.

Betty was the only named vessel in the English and Royal Navy.

Construction and Specifications
She was purchased on 26 April 1695 as a privateer at Bristol in British service. She was established into the Royal Navy on 29 April 1695. Her builder's measure tonnage was calculated as 384 tons (burthen).

The gun armament initially was four demi-culverins on the lower deck (LD) with two pair of guns per side. The upper deck (UD) battery would consist of between twenty and twenty-two 6-pounder guns with ten or eleven guns per side. The gun battery would be completed by four 4-pounder guns on the quarterdeck (QD) with two to three guns per side.

Commissioned Service
She was commissioned in 1695 under the command of Captain James Powell, RN for service in the West Indies. She was captured by a French 30-gun privateer while defending a homebound convoy on 14 August 1695 during which Captain Powell was killed along with 18 members of the crew with 14 wounded. She was in French hands until 15 February 1696 when she was recaptured by HMS Phoenix and renamed Betty Prize. She reverted to her original name and had Commander Thomas Lambert, RN placed in command on 4 March 1696. On 20 October Commander Lambert was promoted to captain. She was patrolling with a detached squadron under the command of Captain Thomas Harlow when on the 14th of August 1697 the spotted Monsieur de Pontis returning to Brest. They gave chase but the French squadron made their escape. She was off Lisbon, Portugal with Vice-Admiral Lord Matthew Aylmer's Fleet before proceeding to the Mediterranean for 1698/99 to re-establish the counter piracy terms with the Moors of North Africa by visiting Tunis, Tripoli and Algier. On 3 March 1701 Captain Peregrine Bertie, RN took command and sailed to Guinea in Africa, then was doing survey work off Ireland in 1702.

Disposition
HMS Betty was sold by Admiralty Order (AO) September 1702 for £147 on 1 October 1702.

Notes

Citations

References

 Winfield (2009), British Warships in the Age of Sail (1603 – 1714), by Rif Winfield, published by Seaforth Publishing, England © 2009, EPUB 
 Colledge (2020), Ships of the Royal Navy, by J.J. Colledge, revised and updated by Lt Cdr Ben Warlow and Steve Bush, published by Seaforth Publishing, Barnsley, Great Britain, © 2020, EPUB 
 Lavery (1989), The Arming and Fitting of English Ships of War 1600 - 1815, by Brian Lavery, published by US Naval Institute Press © Brian Lavery 1989, Part V Guns, Type of Guns
 Clowes (1898), The Royal Navy, A History from the Earliest Times to the Present (Vol. II). London. England: Sampson Low, Marston & Company, © 1898

Frigates of the Royal Navy
Naval ships of the United Kingdom
1690s ships